Per Hysing-Dahl, DFC & Bar (born 31 July 1920 in Bergen, died 7 April 1989) was a Norwegian resistance member, pilot, industry manager and politician for the Conservative Party.

He was elected to the Norwegian Parliament from Hordaland in 1969, and was re-elected on three occasions. During the term 8 October 1981–30 September 1985 he was President of the Storting.

On the local level he was a member of Fana municipality council from 1959 to 1967. He chaired the county party chapter from 1971 to 1972.

References

External links

1920 births
1989 deaths
People educated at the Bergen Cathedral School
Presidents of the Storting
Members of the Storting
Conservative Party (Norway) politicians
Politicians from Bergen
20th-century Norwegian businesspeople
Royal Norwegian Air Force personnel of World War II
Norwegian aviators
Norwegian World War II pilots
Norwegian Royal Air Force pilots of World War II
Recipients of the War Cross with Sword (Norway)
Recipients of the St. Olav's Medal with Oak Branch
Recipients of the Distinguished Flying Cross (United Kingdom)
Recipients of the Croix de Guerre 1939–1945 (France)
Commandeurs of the Légion d'honneur
20th-century Norwegian politicians